Dziornavičy (Дзёрнавічы) is a village in the Verkhnyadzvinsk District of the Vitebsk Region, Belarus. The village is nearby Iskra

References

Populated places in Belarus
Verkhnyadzvinsk District
Drissensky Uyezd